The Canton of Villefranche-sur-Saône is a French administrative division, located in the Rhône department.

The canton was established in 1790 and modified by decree of 28 February 2000 which came into force in March 2001.

Composition 
The canton of Villefranche-sur-Saône is composed of 1 commune:

See also
Cantons of the Rhône department
Communes of the Rhône department

References

Cantons of Rhône (department)
1790 establishments in France